Constituent Assembly elections were held in Honduras on 26 January 1936.

Background
Congress voted on 6 January to call elections for a Constituent Assembly to write a new constitution, with 56 in favour and two against.

Results

Aftermath
The newly elected Assembly met for the first time on 8 March. It drafted a constitution, article 202 of which allowed president Tiburcio Carías Andino and vice president Abraham Williams Calderón to continue in power until 1 January 1943. It also extended its term until December 1942.

References

Bibliography
Argueta, Mario. Tiburcio Carías: anatomía de una época, 1923-1948. Tegucigalpa: Editorial Guaymuras. 1989. 
Dodd, Thomas JTiburcio Carías: portrait of a Honduran political leader. Baton Rouge: Louisiana State University Press. . 2005. 
Elections in the Americas A Data Handbook Volume 1. North America, Central America, and the Caribbean. Edited by Dieter Nohlen. 2005.
Political handbook of the world 1937. New York, 1938.
Stokes, William S. Honduras: an area study in government. Madison: University of Wisconsin Press. 1950. 

Elections in Honduras
Honduras
1936 in Honduras
January 1936 events
Election and referendum articles with incomplete results